Anomotachys is a genus of ground beetles in the family Carabidae. There are at least three described species in Anomotachys.

Species
These three species belong to the genus Anomotachys:
 Anomotachys acaroides (Motschulsky, 1860)  (Sri Lanka and Indonesia)
 Anomotachys curtus Jeannel, 1946  (Madagascar)
 Anomotachys cyrtonotus Jeannel, 1946  (worldwide)

References

Trechinae